The following is a list of Lasiocampidae of Nepal. Fifty-six different species are listed.

This list is primarily based on Colin Smith's 2010 "Lepidoptera of Nepal", which is based on Toshiro Haruta's "Moths of Nepal (Vol. 1-6)" with some recent additions and a modernized classification. 

Alompra ferruginea ferruginea
Amurilla subpurpurea
Argonestis flammans
Arguda decurtata
Arguda vinata nepalina
Baodera khasiana
Bharetta cinnamomea
Chilena similis
Cosmotriche discitincta szini
Dendrolimus himalayanus
Dendrolimus phantom
Euthrix decisa
Euthrix inobtusa
Euthrix isocyma
Euthrix laeta
Eteinopla signata 
Euthrix vulpes
Gastropacha eberti
Gastropacha encausta
Gastropacha pardale
Gastropacha pardale philippinensis
Gastropacha sikkima
Gastropacha xenapates xenapates
Kosala flavosignata
Kunugia ampla
Kunugia fulgens
Kunugia latipennis
Kunugia lineata
Kunugia undans
Lebeda nobilis nobilis
Lebeda trifascia
Lenodora castanea
Lenodora semihyalina
Malacosoma indica
Malacosoma parallela
Metanastria gemella
Metanastria hyrtaca syn. Metanastria repanda
Micropacha lidderdalii
Odonestis bheroba
Odonestis pruni
Paradoxopla sinuata
Paradoxopla undulifera
Paralebeda femorata karmata
Paralebeda plagifera syn. Paralebeda urda
Pyrosis fulviplaga
Pyrosis hreblayi
Pyrosis sp. (unknown species from the east)
Pyrosis undulosa
Pyrosis undulosa gadragana
Radhica flavovittata
Streblote dorsalis syn. Taragama igniflua
Streblote siva
Suana concolor
Syrastrena lajonquieri fortelineata
Syrastrena sumatrana sinensis
Syrastrenopsis bilinea
Trabala vishnou
Trabala vishnou f. viridis

See also
List of butterflies of Nepal
Odonata of Nepal
Cerambycidae of Nepal
Wildlife of Nepal

References

 01
Lasiocampidae
Insects of Nepal